Rolf Böger (9 August 1908 – 17 January 1995) was a German politician of the Free Democratic Party (FDP) and former member of the German Bundestag.

Life 
Via the state list of North Rhine-Westphalia, he entered the 7th German Bundestag on 25 January 1973 as Rudolf Augstein's successor.

Literature

References

1908 births
1995 deaths
Members of the Bundestag for North Rhine-Westphalia
Members of the Bundestag 1972–1976
Members of the Bundestag for the Free Democratic Party (Germany)